The Canton of La Désirade is a former canton in the Arrondissement of Pointe-à-Pitre in the department of Guadeloupe. It had 1,532 inhabitants (2012). It is located on La Désirade Island. It was disbanded following the French canton reorganisation which came into effect in March 2015. It comprised the commune of La Désirade, which joined the canton of Saint-François in 2015.

See also
Cantons of Guadeloupe
Communes of Guadeloupe
Arrondissements of Guadeloupe

References

Desirade
2015 disestablishments in France
States and territories disestablished in 2015